The 2016 UCI BMX World Championships was the twenty-first edition of the UCI BMX World Championships, which took place over 25–29 May 2016 in Medellín, Colombia to crown world champions in the cycling discipline of BMX.

Medal summary

Medal table

References

External links

UCI BMX World Championships
UCI BMX World Championships
2016 in Colombian sport
International sports competitions hosted by Colombia